Masjid Al-Abdul Razak (Jawi:مسجد العبد الرزاق; Malay for Al-Abdul Razak Mosque) is a mosque in Singapore, located at Jalan Ismail, off Jalan Eunos. The mosque is accessible from Eunos MRT station.

Construction of the mosque started in mid-1964 during which Singapore was under Malaysian rule. The mosque was completed at the end of 1965, after Singapore's independence from the Malaysian Federation. In March 1966, it was officially opened by the late Mr Yusof Bin Ishak, Singapore's first President of the Republic of Singapore.

History of Area 
Historical maps from 1800s to mid-1900s have shown that the area was once called Perseverance Estate. The 1900s showed the rise of kampung houses with majority of the land owned by wealthy Arab families who used the land for plantations. The area was part of the Jalan Eunos Malay Settlement also known as the last Malay settlement.

History 
The mosque was named after an Arab business man from Kuwait, Abdul Razak, who owned the land where the mosque is. He sponsored its construction after he had donated that land as a waqf.

After the official opening, Tuan Syed Hussain Ali Habsyi was appointed as the Imam of the mosque. He lived at the quarters located behind at the mosque itself. He, together with several elders who resided in the area were the original caretakers of the mosque. They formed the first unofficial management committee of the mosque. The mosque was initially open exclusively to male congregation only.

Establishment of official board 
In 1991, the mosque was taken over by Majlis Ugama Islam Singapura (MUIS), the Islamic Religious Council of Singapore. Imam Tuan Syed Hussain Ali Habsyi and other active individuals from the congregation were officially appointed as the mosque's Mosque Management Board (MMB) by MUIS.

After MMB's formation, efforts were made to have a segregated area in the mosque for the female congregation to perform their prayers. Religious class (Fardhu Ain) especially for women was started and led by Hajjah Habsah Bte Senin whom teaches the class till this day.

Longevity of Mosque 

Since its establishment, activities organized at the mosque has always centered around religious enrichment. During the tenure of Imam Tuan Syed Hussain Al-Habsyi, he managed to attract and gather numerous well known ‘ulama and asatizah (religious scholars and religious teachers) to congregate at the mosque to conduct religious lessons and to discuss religious issues for the benefit of Muslims in Singapore. Until today, the mosque has a good reputation among ‘ulamak and asatizah.

The mosque has seen an increasing number of events being held since its establishment and an increasing number of Muslims congregating at the mosque for its programs, Friday prayers and especially during the holy month of Ramadan. The mosque have weekly and monthly programs which has been a staple for years. Examples of its regular weekly programs are as Maulid Dibaie and Fardhu Ain class for women. Majority of the activities are held in the prayer hall seen in Fig. 2. These factors show that the Muslim community holds a positive image towards the mosque which has helped with its sustainability and can benefit its outlook.

Renovations 
Mosque had minor renovations in 1991 and 1997 to fix worn down structures of the mosque. The flooring of the main prayer hall would sink every few years. The reason was assumed to be because of marine soil which the mosque was built on. Such soil conditions are usually found near the shoreline.

Area of mosque had undergone major redevelopment in the 1980s, causing soil movement that affected the mosque which was built simply without extensive foundation. The cumulative factors of wear and tear, urban redevelopment and turbulent soil conditions were possible reasons leading to the minor renovations in the 1990s.

Major renovation works of 2007-2008 
Conditions of the mosque during 2007 called for renovations and upgrading. This round of renovations will include piling work for the flooring of the main prayer hall to deter future incidences of flooring issue. Additionally, the quarters was demolished to make way for an administrative office and multipurpose hall. Facilities and areas surrounding the main mosque building were revamped as well. 

Despite the major upgrades, the mosque retains its original shape to preserve its freehold status as a landed property. Instead, extended prayer areas were made through modification of the closed veranda area seen in Fig. 4 (located at the entrance to the main prayer hall) to become open (Fig. 3). Also, the space in front of the newly built multipurpose hall can be used for prayer space. This allowed for the maximum capacity of the mosque to change from an estimate of 350 people to approximately 700 people.

The mosque was officially reopened in June 2009 by Dr Yaacob Ibrahim and the former Mufti Tuan Syed Isa Semait.

Features 
In the prayer hall, a new mimbar (sermon podium) was built into the mihrab (niche area that shows the direction of the qibla'). The simple and bare rectangular prayer hall remains the same which reflects the core function of the mosque which is a place for prayer. From an aerial view, the mosque was built oriented to the direction of the qibla. Other features like a minaret and dome are common for old-style kampung mosques.

See also
 Islam in Singapore
 List of mosques in Singapore
 Majlis Ugama Islam Singapura

References

External links 

1965 establishments in Singapore
Mosques completed in 1965
Al-Abdul Razak
20th-century architecture in Singapore